Ivor Erskine St Clair Ramsay (1 November 1902 – 22 January 1956) was an eminent Anglican priest in the middle part of the  20th century.

He was born on 1 November 1902 and educated at Ardvreck School, Uppingham and Glasgow University. He was ordained in 1925 and began his career with  a curacy at St Paul's Cathedral, Dundee. In 1931 he became a  Novice of the College of the Resurrection, Mirfield and the following year Chaplain of the Home of St Francis, Dunfermline. He then held incumbencies at St John's Church, Jedburgh, Christ Church, Falkirk and St Andrew's, Dunmore before being appointed Provost of St Mary's Cathedral, Edinburgh. In 1949 he was appointed Dean of King's College, Cambridge, a post he held until January 1956 when he jumped to his death from the roof of King's College Chapel after reportedly suffering from depression. He was succeeded at King's by Dr. Alec Vidler.

References

1902 births
1956 suicides
People educated at Uppingham School
People educated at Ardvreck School
Alumni of the University of Glasgow
Alumni of the College of the Resurrection
Provosts of St Mary's Cathedral, Edinburgh (Episcopal)
Fellows of King's College, Cambridge
Suicides by jumping in England
Deans of King's College, Cambridge